Peter Mohr Dam (11 August 1898 – 8 November 1968) was a Faroe Islands politician who was one of the founders of the  Social Democratic Javnaðarflokkurin party in 1926.

Born on 11 August 1898, in Skopun, Faroe Islands, Dam became a teacher in Tvøroyri. 

He was member of the Faroese Løgting from 1926 until his death in 1968. Chairman of the Social Democratic Javnaðarflokkurin party from 1936 until his death in 68. He was a member of the town council of Tvøroyri from 1925 until his death, mayor of Tvøroyri from 1934–1957.

He was member of the Danish Folketing as one of two Faroese members from 1948–1957 and 1964–1967. From 1958 to 1963 and from 1967 to 1968 he was the Prime Minister of the Faroe Islands (Løgmaður). Dam died in office, on 8 November 1968.

He was the father of three-time prime minister Atli P. Dam. His granddaughters, Helena Dam á Neystabø and Rigmor Dam, are also Social Democratic politicians.

1898 births
1968 deaths
Prime Ministers of the Faroe Islands
Social Democratic Party (Faroe Islands) politicians
People from Tvøroyri
Faroese members of the Folketing
Members of the Løgting
Faroese schoolteachers